Wonthella is an inner northern suburb of Geraldton, Western Australia. Its local government area is the City of Greater Geraldton.

The suburb was gazetted in 1972.

References

Suburbs of Geraldton